Van Wie Farmstead, also known as Valley View Farm, is a historic home and related farm outbuildings located near McKinley in Montgomery County, New York.  It includes the farmhouse, a carriage house, a large multi-block barn (1874 and later), a slat sided hay barn, a Butler grain bin (c. 1950), pole barn (c. 1950), and a hop barn (c. 1884).  The house consists of a two-story, Italianate style main block built in 1873, with an attached 1 1/2 story all dated to c. 1850.

It was added to the National Register of Historic Places in 2011.

References

Farms on the National Register of Historic Places in New York (state)
Italianate architecture in New York (state)
Houses completed in 1873
Buildings and structures in Montgomery County, New York
National Register of Historic Places in Montgomery County, New York